The Rob Stewart Award, formerly known as the Gemini/Canadian Screen Award for Best Science or Nature Documentary Program, is a Canadian television award, presented by the Academy of Canadian Cinema and Television to honour the year's best television documentary on a scientific or nature topic. Formerly presented as part of the Gemini Awards, since 2013 it has been presented as part of the Canadian Screen Awards. The award is open to both standalone documentary films and relevant episodes of television documentary series; in particular, episodes of the CBC Television documentary series The Nature of Things have frequently been nominees for or winners of the award.

The award was renamed to its current name in 2017 in memory of Rob Stewart, an influential Canadian director of science and nature documentary films who died in January 2017.

Nominees and winners

1990s

2000s

2010s

2020s

References

Canadian Screen Award television categories
Canadian documentary film awards